Imperial State Electric is a Swedish rock band founded by former front man of The Hellacopters Nicke Andersson (vocals and guitar), Dolph de Borst (vocals, bass), Tobias Egge (vocals, guitar) and Tomas Eriksson (drums). The band released their self-titled album March 28, 2010.

History
After the break-up of The Hellacopters in 2008, Andersson started to work on a solo album, recording all instruments of eight songs by himself, however Andersson changed his mind and decided that it would be better to form a band. Andersson recruited Dolf de Borst, Tobias Egge and Tomas Eriksson, all of whom he had previously worked with in Cold Ethyl, a cover band he formed shortly after the break-up of The Hellacopters. During the recording of the band's self-titled album Andersson also enlisted help from several old friends, including Dregen, Anders Lindström, Robert Pehrsson and Neil Leyton. While Andersson insists that Imperial State Electric is a band and not a solo career or a side project he also acknowledges the fact that the band might have a revolving line-up of members including himself on drums instead of guitar.

Members
Current touring line-up
Nicke Andersson: vocals, guitar
Dolf de Borst: backing vocals, bass
Tobias Egge: backing vocals, guitar
Tomas Eriksson: drums, percussion

Other contributors
Robert Pehrsson: backing vocals, guitar, filled in for Tobias Egge on the Spain tour in February and March 2011
Dregen: backing vocals, guitar, additional third live guitarist on selected concerts
Neil Leyton: vocals, joined the band live on their Spanish tour 2010

Discography

Albums
2010: Imperial State Electric [Psychout Records]
2012: Pop War [Psychout Records]
2013: Reptile Brain Music [Psychout Records]
2015: Honk Machine [Psychout Records]
2016: All Through the Night [Psychout Records]
2018: Anywhere Loud (Live) [Psychout Records]

Compilations
2013: Radio Electric [Trooper Entertainment] Japanese Exclusive Collection of Non-album Tracks

EPs
2011: In Concert [Psychout Records]
2014: Eyes [Psychout Records]

Singles
2010: "That's Where It's At" / "Oh Babe" [Ghost Highway Recordings]
2010: "Resign" 
2010: "Castaway" with The Bloodlights [Soulseller Records]
2011: "Wail Baby Wail" / "Fight It Back"  [Ghost Highway Recordings]
2011: "Rock Science" [Psychout Records] and Rock Science Records (Sent as part of the Rock Science Game Board)
2012: "You Don't Want To Know" / "Maggie May" [Ghost Highway Recordings]
2012: "I Ain't Gonna Be History" / "Wild Tales" [Onslaught Of Steel Records]
2012: "Sheltered in the Sand" / "Black Widow Blues" [Psychout Records]
2012: "Cagey Cretins" with Smoke Mohawk [Lightning Records]
2012: "Can't Seem to Shake It Of My Mind" / "Cry A Little Longer" [Psychout Records]
2013: "Policy of Truth" with Mary's Kids [Bootleg Booze]
2013: "Uh Huh" (electric & acoustic versions) [Psychout Records]
2013: "Reptile Brain" / "Reptile Sludge" [Psychout/Bootleg Booze]
2014: "(Why Don't You) Leave It Alone" / "Heeby Jeebies" [AM Records]
2014: "What You Want" / "How Can You Do It Baby" [Ghost Highway Recordings]
2015: "All Over My Head" [Psychout Records]

References

External links
Official MySpace
February 2011 - Métronome / An interview with Nicke Andersson (Spanish)
German language interview in OX Fanzine #91 August/September 2010
Official Web Site

Swedish rock music groups